Taringa is a genus of sea slugs, dorid nudibranchs, shell-less marine gastropod mollusks in the family Discodorididae.

Species
Species in the genus Taringa include:
 Taringa aivica Marcus & Marcus, 1967
 Taringa arcaica Moro y Ortea, 2015
 Taringa armata Swennen, 1961
 Taringa ascitica Ortea, Perez & Llera, 1982
 Taringa bacalladoi Ortea, Perez & Llera, 1982
 Taringa faba Ballesteros, Llera & Ortea, 1985
 Taringa halgerda Gosliner & Behrens, 1998
 Taringa iemanja Alvim & Pimenta, 2013
 Taringa oleica Ortea, Perez & Llera, 1982
 Taringa pinoi Perrone, 1985
 Taringa robledales Ortea, Moro y Espinosa, 2015
 Taringa sublutea (Abraham, 1877)
 Taringa telopia Marcus, 1955 - type species of the genus Taringa
 Taringa tritorquis Ortea, Perez & Llera, 1982
Synonyms
 Taringa caudata (Farran, 1905): synonym of Taringa sublutea (Abraham, 1877)
 Taringa fanabensis Ortea & Martínez, 1992: synonym of Taringa millegrana (Alder & Hancock, 1854): synonym of Aporodoris millegrana (Alder & Hancock, 1854)
 Taringa luteola (Kelaart, 1858): synonym of Taringa sublutea (Abraham, 1877)
 Taringa millegrana (Alder & Hancock, 1854): synonym of Aporodoris millegrana (Alder & Hancock, 1854)
 Taringa tarifaensis García-Gómez, Cervera & García-Martin, 1993: synonym of Taringa millegrana (Alder & Hancock, 1854): synonym of Aporodoris millegrana (Alder & Hancock, 1854)

Taxonomy
The genus Taringa was described by Ernst Gustav Gotthelf Marcus in 1955 with the type species Taringa telopia.

Valdés & Gosliner (2001) synonymized the genera Aporodoris Ihering, 1886 and Taringa Er. Marcus, 1955. They used Taringa as the valid name (declaring it to be a nomen protectum) because they (erroneously) considered the senior synonym Aporodoris not to have been used as a valid name since 1886.

Valdés & Gosliner (2001) carried out an erroneous reversal precedence. The International Commission on Zoological Nomenclature should publish a decision on which name should be used in such cases, according to Article 23.10 of the International Code of Zoological Nomenclature. In the meantime, the name in prevailing usage must be used (according to Article 23.10).

Dayrat (2010) agreed with the synonymization of the genera Aporodoris and Taringa. However, he considered the generic name Aporodoris and the specific name Aporodoris millegrana to be valid using strict application of the Principle of Priority.

List of works with the name Aporodoris used as valid:
 Ihering 1886
 Eliot 1910 - he provisionally used the genus Aporodoris
 Burn 1973
 Dayrat 2010

Genus Taringa was used as valid in at least 30 works. List of works with the name Taringa used as valid:
 Er. Marcus 1955
 Swennen 1961
 Marcus & Marcus, 1967
 Marcus E. 1976
 Behrens & Henderson 1982
 Ortea, Perez & Llera, 1982
 Ballesteros, Llera & Ortea, 1985
 Perrone 1985
 Perrone 1986
 Gosliner & Behrens 1998
 Ortea & Martínez 1992
 García-Gómez, Cervera & García-Martín 1993
 Valdés & Gosliner 2001
 Valdés 2002
 Camacho-García & Valdés 2003
 Dayrat 2005
 Dayrat & Gosliner 2005
 Johnson 2008 unpublished
 Camacho-García 2009 
 Malaquias et al. 2009
 Johnson 2011

Overview of works with unclear use of the name Taringa and Aporodoris:
 Dayrat 2011

References

Further reading 
 Gofas, S.; Le Renard, J.; Bouchet, P. (2001). Mollusca, in: Costello, M.J. et al. (Ed.) (2001). European register of marine species: a check-list of the marine species in Europe and a bibliography of guides to their identification. Collection Patrimoines Naturels, 50: pp. 180–213

External links 

Discodorididae
Taxa named by Ernst Marcus (zoologist)